Cruising for sex, or cruising, is walking or driving about a locality, called a cruising ground, in search of a sex partner, usually of the anonymous, casual, one-time variety. The term is also used when technology is used to find casual sex, such as using an Internet site or a telephone service.

Origin and historical usage
According to historian and author Tim Blanning, the term cruising originates from the Dutch equivalent .

In a specifically sexual context, the term "cruising" originally emerged as an argot "code word" in gay slang, by which those "in the know" would understand the speaker's unstated sexual intent, whereas most heterosexuals, on hearing the same word in the same context, would normally misread the speaker's intended meaning in the word's more common nonsexual sense. This served (and in some contexts, still serves) as a protective sociolinguistic mechanism for gay men to recognize each other, and avoid being recognized by those who may wish to do them harm in broader societies noted for their homophobia.

In the latter half of the twentieth century, decriminalization of homosexual behaviour increasingly became the norm in English-speaking countries. The protective barrier once provided by the term "cruising" as a "code word" has therefore largely broken down and, arguably, become increasingly irrelevant. Thus the specifically sexual meaning of the term has passed into common usage to include the sexual behavior of heterosexual persons, as well.

Public health officials have noted that cruising locations are frequented by men who have sex with men, but do not identify with being homosexual or bisexual, who are closeted, married, or in relationships with women, do not date men or frequent gay bars, clubs or websites, or have otherwise no other way of meeting men for sex.

The cruising places are often considered meeting places for men who are otherwise living more conventional lifestyles. For instance, it was noted in Laud Humphreys' 1970 study about anonymous gay sex meeting places that most men who visited those places were at least seeming heterosexuals who had families.

Regional usage variants
In the United States, the term "cruising" was used predominantly to denote exclusively homosexual behavior, but in Australia and the United Kingdom it is used by both homosexuals and heterosexuals to describe their own behavior, as witnessed in the common male heterosexual derivative phrase "cruising for chicks".

In the United States, cruising often takes place in gay bars, adult video arcades often through gloryholes, adult movie theaters, public toilets, parks, saunas, gyms or gay bathhouses.  Engaging in such activities in public places like parks has led to participants being charged with indecent exposure.

In popular culture
Cruising for sex is alluded to in songs such as "Cruisin' the Streets" by the Boys Town Gang as well as "I'm a Cruiser" by the Village People, on the album titled Cruisin'.

In 1980, director William Friedkin made the film Cruising, starring Al Pacino. The film introduced many audiences to homosexual activities and the linguistic codes used for them, but gay rights groups perceived a negative depiction of the gay community in the film and protested its production.

The opening scene of the first episode of the HBO series Looking involves the main character Patrick (Jonathan Groff) cruising in a park, mainly out of curiosity of whether the activity is still in practice or not.

Cruising for sex was explored in Cruising Pavilion, a 2018 art installation associated with the Venice Biennale of Architecture.

See also

 Cottaging
 [[Cruisin' (Village People album)|Cruisin''' (album)]]
 Dogging (sexual slang)
 Gay bathhouse
 Gay beat
 Gay cruising in the United Kingdom
 Glory hole
 Homosocialization
 Nudity and sexuality
 Sexuality and space
 Squirt.org
 Troll (gay)

References

External links
 "The Little Black Book: This one can keep you out of trouble" from Lambda Legal Defense and Education Fund''; also available here. Additionally published as "Little Black Book: This one will keep you out of trouble" in PDF format; also available here. An article that gives legal advice on cruising for sex. Note that if one actually carries this article on one while cruising it could possibly be used as evidence of intent.

Human sexuality
Intimate relationships
LGBT terminology
Male homosexuality
Casual sex